Mark Norris is a British consultant in the field of software engineering and telecommunications,  noted as for his work writing on technology-related subjects.

He gained a doctorate from the University of Glasgow in 1979 and has since worked in Australia, Europe, the Middle East and Japan in the telecommunications industry (working for some years for BT Group) and in academia (holding a position of Visiting Professor at the University of Ulster).

Norris is a Fellow of the Institution of Engineering and Technology (formerly known as the Institution of Electrical Engineers).

References

Bibliography

Norris, Mark; Rigby, Peter, Software Engineering Explained, John Wiley & Sons Ltd, Chichester, 1992. ISBN
Norris, Rigby, Payne, The Healthy Software Project: A Guide to Successful Development and Management, John Wiley & Sons Ltd, Chichester, 1993, ISBN
Norris, Mark, Survival in the Software Jungle, Artech House, 1995. ISBN
Norris, Mark; Winton, Neil, Energize the Network: Distributed Computing Explained, Addison-Wesley, 1997. ISBN
Norris, Mark; Frost, Andrew, Exploiting the Internet: Understanding and Exploiting an Investment in the Internet, John Wiley & Sons Ltd, Chichester, 1997. ISBN
West, Steve; Norris, Mark, Media Engineering: A Guide to Developing Information Products, John Wiley & Sons Ltd, Chichester, 1997, ISBN
Atkins, John; Norris, M, Total Area Networking, 2nd Edition, John Wiley & Sons Ltd, Chichester, 1999. ISBN
Norris, Mark; Pretty, Steve, Designing the Total Area Network: Intranets, VPN's and Enterprise Networks Explained, John Wiley & Sons Ltd, Chichester, 1999, ISBN
Bustard, Dave; Kawalek, Peter; Norris, Mark (Editors), Systems Modeling for Business Process Improvement, Artech House, 2000. ISBN
Norris, M, Communications Technology Explained, John Wiley & Sons Ltd, Chichester, 2000. ISBN
Norris, Mark; West, Steve, eBusiness essentials: technology and network requirements for mobile and online markets, 2nd Edition, John Wiley & Sons Ltd, Chichester, 2001. ISBN
Norris, Mark, Mobile IP Technology for M-Business, Artech House, 2001.ISBN
Norris, Mark, Gigabit Ethernet Technology and Applications,Artech House, 2002. ISBN

British technology writers
Norris, Mark (technology writer)
Fellows of the Institution of Engineering and Technology
Alumni of the University of Glasgow
British Telecom people
Year of birth missing (living people)